Iván "John" Borodiak (born 1940) is an Argentine-American soccer full back  who played for Argentina, the American Soccer League and the North American Soccer League.  He also earned one cap with the U.S. national team.

Professional
Borodiak was born in Argentina of Ukrainian descent, and started his career in the Argentine league, playing for Talleres de Remedios de Escalada, and later for Almagro.  In early 1960, the Philadelphia Ukrainian Nationals of the American Soccer League (ASL) signed Borodiak to bolster the squad for an upcoming National Challenge Cup series. The move paid off and the Ukes won the 1960, 1961, 1963 and 1967 National Challenge Cups. In 1965, during the ASL off season he played in the Eastern Canada Professional Soccer League with Toronto Roma. In 1967, he played for the Newark Ukrainian Sitch and Philadelphia Spartans. In 1968, Borodiak signed with the Cleveland Stokers of the North American Soccer League.  The next year, he transferred to the Baltimore Bays. That season, he was a first team NASL All Star.

National team
Borodiak earned one cap with the U.S. national team in a 10-0 loss to England on May 27, 1964.

References

External links
 NASL stats
Ukrainian Football Diaspora @ Sport.ua

1940 births
Living people
Footballers from Buenos Aires
Talleres de Remedios de Escalada footballers
Club Almagro players
American soccer players
American Soccer League (1933–1983) players
American people of Ukrainian descent
Argentine people of Ukrainian descent
Argentine emigrants to the United States
Argentine footballers
Baltimore Bays players
Cleveland Stokers players
Eastern Canada Professional Soccer League players
National Professional Soccer League (1967) players
North American Soccer League (1968–1984) players
Philadelphia Spartans players
Philadelphia Ukrainian Nationals players
Toronto Roma players
United States men's international soccer players

Association football fullbacks